Sanguem is a city and a municipal council in South Goa district in the Indian state of Goa.
Notable landmarks include the Sagameshwar Temple, Bhagwan Mahaveer Sanctuary and Mollem National Park and the Salaulim Dam.

Geography
It has an average elevation of 22 metres (72 feet).

Demographics
 India census, Sanguem had a population of 6444 of which 3162 were males and 3282 females with female sex ratio of 1038 against state average of 973. Sanguem has a literacy rate of 88.39%, lower than the state average of 88.70%: male literacy is 92.41%, and female literacy is 84.49%. In Sanguem, 10.30% or 664 of the population is under 6 years of age. Konkani is the primary language spoken here.

Government and politics
Sanguem is part of Sanguem (Goa Assembly constituency) and South Goa (Lok Sabha constituency).

References

External links

Sanguem map

Cities and towns in South Goa district